The 1766 Istanbul earthquake was a strong earthquake with epicenter in the eastern part of the Sea of Marmara, in the Çınarcık Basin (or near the Princes' Islands, north of the basin) which occurred in the early hours of Thursday morning, 22 May 1766.  The earthquake had an estimated magnitude of 7.1 on the surface wave magnitude scale, and caused effects in a vast area extending from Izmit to Rodosto (now Tekirdağ). In this area, the earthquake was followed by a tsunami which caused significant damage. The earthquake of 1766 was the last major earthquake to rock Constantinople (now known in English under its Turkish name, Istanbul) because of a rupture of the North Anatolian Fault in the Marmara region.

Geology
The Sea of Marmara is a pull-apart basin formed at a releasing bend in the North Anatolian Fault ("NAF"), a right-lateral strike-slip fault. This local zone of extension occurs where this transform boundary between the Anatolian Plate and the Eurasian Plate steps northwards to the west of Izmit from the Izmit Fault to the Ganos Fault. Inside the Sea of Marmara there is a smaller pull-apart basin, named the North Marmara fault System ("NMFS"), which connect the three submarine basins (from W to E: Tekirdağ, Central and Çınarcık) with the Izmit and Ganos Fault (both inland). Near Istanbul the northern side of the NMFS pull-apart coincides with the northern branch of the NAF and is a single main fault segment with a sharp bend. To the west, the fault trends W-E and is pure strike-slip in type. To the east, the fault is NW-SE trending and shows evidence of both normal and strike-slip motion.

In 1766, the rupture of the fault happened either under the Princes' Islands or, more probably, under the Çınarcık Basin, since a more central break could not have caused the great tsunami that struck Istanbul and the Gulf of Izmit, although this had been produced by a submarine landslide. The 1766 event has been the last one caused by a rupture of the NAF in the Marmara region; successive large events which caused extensive damages in Istanbul, like the earthquake of 10 July 1894 (with epicenter in the gulf of Izmit) and that of 9 August 1912 (with epicenter NW of Marmara Island), have to be considered isolated events caused by the non uniform stress relief during the 18th century earthquake sequence, to which the 1766 event belongs. Since the second last major event with an epicenter in the Istanbul region occurred in 1509, a recurrence interval of 200–250 years has been hypothesized.

Characteristics
The earthquake began half an hour after sunrise, at 5:10 a.m. on May 22, 1766, which was the third day of the Kurban Bairam. The first shock, accompanied by a loud roar, lasted two minutes:  it was followed by a less intense shock lasting four minutes, and aftershocks continued for eight minutes. In the following weeks there were also several aftershocks, and the duration of the whole sequence amounted to one year.

The earthquake was felt as far away as Aydın, Thessaloniki, on Mount Athos, Aytos in eastern Bulgaria and along the west coast of the Black Sea.  This earthquake was compared to the catastrophic one in Lisbon, which occurred 11 years earlier.

Damage

The estimated area of significant damage (greater than the MCS VII grade (Very Strong)) extends from Bursa to Küçükçekmece, but destruction occurred from Tekirdağ and Gelibolu to the west, Izmit to the east and Edirne to the north. The settlements on the Gulf of Mudanya also suffered damage, while Galata and Büyükçekmece were severely damaged. In Constantinople the intensity of the earthquake was estimated between grade VII  and VIII-IX; many houses and public buildings collapsed. Furthermore, part of the underground water distribution system was destroyed; the Ayvad dam, on the upper Kâğıthane, was damaged, and in Istanbul the vault of an underground cistern subsided.

In Istanbul, most of the mosques and churches were damaged, as was the Topkapı Palace: the sultan had to live in temporary housing until his home was restored. The panicking populace was unable to go back home, and people sheltered themselves in tents pitched in wide and open spaces. Among the imperial mosques, the dome of that of Bayezid was damaged, while the minaret and the main dome of the mosque of Mihrimah collapsed. The Süleymaniye Mosque was also damaged, while the Fatih mosque suffered the collapse of the minarets, the main dome and several secondary domes, and 100 students in the Koran school of the Külliye died; so the complex had to be rebuilt. The Kariye Mosque was also seriously damaged, but the mosque of Ayasofya survived instead almost unharmed.

The castle of Yedikule, Eğrikapı, Edirnekapı and the city walls were also damaged, while there were damages to Galata and Pera and to the Grand Bazaar. At Çatalca and in the surrounding villages all the masonry buildings collapsed. Since the earthquake struck the eastern part of the Sea of Marmara, serious damage was also recorded on the southern shore, from Mudanya to Karamürsel, and the tsunami waves made the ports unusable. The highest level of the tsunami was observed in the Bosphorus region; the flood was also strong on the shores of Galata and Mudanya, while some small islands in the Marmara Sea were partially submerged.

Casualties
The number of deaths was estimated at 4,000, of which 880 were in Istanbul.

August earthquake 
In August of the same year, a magnitude 7.4 earthquake struck the Dardanelles region. On that occasion the damage in Istanbul was slight.

References

Sources

1766 in Asia
1766 in Europe
1766 in Ottoman Empire
1766 in science
1766 tsunamis
1760s earthquakes
1766
18th century in Istanbul
Sea of Marmara